Meleshovo is a rural locality (a village) in Moseyevskoye Rural Settlement, Totemsky  District, Vologda Oblast, Russia. The population was 12 as of 2002.

Geography 
Meleshovo is located 52 km northwest of Totma (the district's administrative centre) by road. Danilov Pochinok is the nearest rural locality.

References 

Rural localities in Tarnogsky District